Gábor (sometimes written Gabor) is a common male Hungarian given name. Its equivalent in English is Gabriel.

List of people with the given name Gábor 
 Gábor Andreánszky, Hungarian politician
 Gábor Andreánszky, Hungarian botanist, paleobotanist and explorer
 Gábor Baross, Hungarian politician
 Gábor Báthory, Prince of Transylvania
 Gábor Bethlen, Prince of Transylvania
 Gábor Bódy, Hungarian director
 Gábor Csupó, Hungarian animator
 Gábor Darvas, Hungarian composer and musicologist
 Gábor Döbrentei, Hungarian philologist and antiquary
 Gábor Domokos, Hungarian engineer, developer of the Gömböc
 Gábor Gyepes, Hungarian footballer
 Gábor Harangozó, Hungarian politician
 Gabor Herman, researcher in the field of computed tomography
 Gábor Horváth (canoeist), Hungarian flatwater canoeist
 Gábor Király, Hungarian football goalkeeper
 Gábor Kuncze, Hungarian politician
 Gábor Maté, Hungarian-born Canadian physician
 Gabor Sarkøzy (also Sárközy Gábor) (1945–2008), Hungarian-Norwegian (pornographic) actor and director
 Gabor A. Somorjai, Hungary-born chemist
 Gábor Szabó, Hungarian jazz guitarist
 Gábor Szakácsi, Hungarian-born American rock guitarist 
 Gábor Szegő, Hungarian mathematician
 Gábor Talmácsi, Hungarian motorcycle racer
 Gábor Téglás, Hungarian archaeologist 
 Gábor Totola, Hungarian fencer
 Gábor Vető, Hungarian boxer
 Gábor Wéber, Hungarian race car driver
Gábor Ferenczi, Hungarian steamfitter

Fictional characters

See also
 Gabor (surname)

Given names
Hungarian masculine given names